Brazil competed at the 2020 Winter Youth Olympics in Lausanne, Switzerland from 9 to 22 January 2020.

Biathlon

Girls

Bobsleigh

Cross-country skiing 

Boys

Girls

Curling

Brazil qualified a mixed team of four athletes.
Mixed team

Mixed doubles

Skeleton

Snowboarding

Snowboard cross

See also

Brazil at the 2020 Summer Olympics

References

2020 in Brazilian sport
Nations at the 2020 Winter Youth Olympics
Brazil at the Youth Olympics